The 1933 Australian Championships was a tennis tournament that took place on outdoor Grass courts at the Kooyong Stadium in Melbourne, Australia from 20 January to 31 January. It was the 26th edition of the Australian Championships (now known as the Australian Open), the 7th held in Melbourne, and the first Grand Slam tournament of the year. Australians Jack Crawford and Joan Hartigan won the singles titles.

Finals

Men's singles

 Jack Crawford defeated  Keith Gledhill  2–6, 7–5, 6–3, 6–2

Women's singles

 Joan Hartigan defeated  Coral McInnes Buttsworth  6–4, 6–3

Men's doubles

 Keith Gledhill /  Ellsworth Vines defeated  Jack Crawford /  Gar Moon 6–4, 10–8, 6–2

Women's doubles

 Mall Molesworth /  Emily Hood Westacott defeated  Joan Hartigan /  Marjorie Gladman Van Ryn 6–3, 6–3

Mixed doubles

 Marjorie Cox Crawford /  Jack Crawford defeated  Marjorie Gladman Van Ryn /  Ellsworth Vines 3–6, 7–5, 13–11

External links
 Australian Open official website

1933 in tennis
1933
1933 in Australian tennis